is a Japanese football player.

Playing career
Kuroki was born in Setagaya on August 22, 1996. He joined J3 League club SC Sagamihara from Yokohama FC youth team in 2015. In September, he moved to FK Mladost Carev Dvor. In 2016, he returned to Japan and joined Okinawa SV. From 2017, he played FC Lokomotiv Gorna Oryahovitsa and Lija Athletic FC.

References

External links

Koken Kuroki at ZeroZero

1996 births
Living people
Association football people from Tokyo
Japanese footballers
Japanese expatriate footballers
SC Sagamihara players
Okinawa SV players
FC Lokomotiv Gorna Oryahovitsa players
Lija Athletic F.C. players
Macedonian First Football League players
Second Professional Football League (Bulgaria) players
Japanese expatriate sportspeople in Malta
Japanese expatriate sportspeople in Poland
Japanese expatriate sportspeople in Germany
Expatriate footballers in North Macedonia
Expatriate footballers in Bulgaria
Expatriate footballers in Malta
Expatriate footballers in Oman
Expatriate footballers in Poland
Expatriate footballers in Kosovo
Expatriate footballers in Germany
Association football midfielders